Internal Bleeding Strawberry is Olivia's first mini-album, released on February 21, 2003 and re-released by Tower Records Japan on December 12, 2003.

Track listing
 "Sea Me"
 "Solarhalfbreed"
 "Into the stars"
 "Dress Me Up"
 "Grapefruit Tea"
 "Color of Your Spoon"
 "Internal Bleeding Strawberry"

References

Olivia Lufkin albums
2003 EPs
Avex Group EPs